Edward Foley may refer to:
Edward Foley (cricketer) (1851–1923), English cricketer
 Edward Foley, Capuchin, American Catholic priest and writer
Edward Foley (1676–1747), twice MP for Droitwich
Edward Foley (1747–1803) MP, 2nd son of Thomas Foley, 1st Baron Foley
Edward Thomas Foley (1791–1846), his eldest son
Edward B. Foley, American lawyer, law professor and election law scholar
Edward P. Foley (1891–1980), Speaker of the Prince Edward Island legislature in 1959
 Edmond Foley (1897–1921), sometimes known as Edward, member of the Irish Republican Army
 A fictional CIA director in the Tom Clancy novels